Joseph Poole (born 25 May 1923) is a former professional footballer, who played for Huddersfield Town and Bradford City. He was born in Huddersfield.

References

1923 births
Footballers from Huddersfield
English footballers
Association football forwards
English Football League players
Huddersfield Town A.F.C. players
Bradford City A.F.C. players
1990 deaths